Methylcyclopropane is an organic compound with the structural formula C3H5CH3.  This colorless gas is the monomethyl derivative of cyclopropane.

Reactions 
Methylcyclopropane, like many other cyclopropanes, undergoes ring-opening reactions. Bond cleavage in certain reactions is also reported in conjunction with the use of methylenecyclopropane groups as protective groups for amines.

References

Cyclopropyl compounds
Hydrocarbons